Funny Aminals is a 1972 single-issue anthology underground comic book created by Robert Crumb and a collection of other artists. The work is notable for containing the first published version of Art Spiegelman's Maus, though the version that ran in Funny Aminals was aesthetically and thematically different from the series Spiegelman would publish in Raw Magazine and as a standalone book.

Publication history 
Apex Novelties published the book in July 1972, and it had one print run of an estimated 20,000 to 30,000 copies. The book was initially formulated by Terry Zwigoff after a scarring visit to a slaughterhouse as an anti-animal cruelty book, but the submitted stories departed from that narrative line. Zwigoff later relinquished all editorial control over the comic.

Contents

Reception 
Underground comix database Comixjoint gave Funny Aminals a 9/10 ranking, calling the writing "solid" and the illustrations "exceptional", adding a four-star historical bonus for Maus. Summarizing his review, writer Steven Fox wrote "Funny Aminals is an uneven book, but its review score (especially the writing score) is boosted by "Maus", which also gets credit for the book's historical bonus. And if Crumb hadn't contributed his crafty penmanship and bawdy humor, even "Maus" wouldn't have been enough to earn Funny Aminals the total score of "9" I begrudgingly bestowed upon it".

References

1972 comics debuts
1972 comics endings
One-shot comic titles
Comics by Robert Crumb
Comics by Art Spiegelman
Underground comix